Roger Federer defeated Fernando González 6–3, 6–2, 7–6(7–3) in the final to win the 2006 singles title at the Davidoff Swiss Indoors tennis tournament.

Seeds

Draw

Final

Top half

Bottom half

External links
Draw
Qualifying draw

Singles